The  are a Japanese professional baseball team competing in Nippon Professional Baseball's Central League. Based in Bunkyo, Tokyo, they are one of two professional baseball teams based in Tokyo, the other being the Tokyo Yakult Swallows. They have played their home games in the Tokyo Dome since its opening in 1988. The team's owner is Yomiuri Shimbun Holdings, Japan's largest media conglomerate which also owns two newspapers (including the eponymous Yomiuri Shimbun) and the Nippon Television Network (which includes flagship Nippon TV).

The Giants are the oldest team among the current Japanese professional teams. They are also by far the most successful, having won 22 Japan Series titles and an additional nine in the era of NPB's forerunner, the Japanese Baseball League. Their main rivalry is with the Hanshin Tigers, a team especially popular in the Kansai region. The Yomiuri Giants are regarded as "The New York Yankees of Japan" due to their widespread popularity, past dominance of the league, and polarizing effect on fans. (Baseball fans who are indifferent about teams other than their local team often have an intense dislike for the Giants; on the other hand, the Giants have a large fan base even in cities that have a team of their own.)

The English-language press occasionally calls the team the "Tokyo Giants", but that name has not been in use in Japan for decades. (Lefty O'Doul, a former Major League Baseball player, named the team "Tokyo Giants" in the mid-1930s.) Instead, the team is officially known by the name of its corporate owner, just like the Hanshin Tigers and Orix Buffaloes. The team is often referred by fans and in news headlines and tables simply as Kyojin (巨人, the Japanese word for "giant(s)"), instead of the usual corporate owner's name or the English nickname.

The Yomiuri Giants name and uniforms were based on the New York (now San Francisco) Giants. The team's colors (orange and black) are the same colors worn by the National League's Giants (both then as now in both New York and San Francisco). The stylized lettering on the team's jerseys and caps is similar to the fancy lettering used by the Giants when they played in New York in the 1930s, although during the 1970s the Yomiuri Giants modernized their lettering to follow the style worn by the San Francisco Giants.

Franchise history

Great Japan Tokyo Baseball Club 
While prior Japanese all-star contingents had disbanded, Shōriki went pro with this group, playing in an independent league. They later went to America and faced off against college and minor league teams. When they faced off against the San Francisco Seals, the manager of the Seals, Lefty O'Doul, stated the team needed a name. He said that since Tokyo was the New York of Japan, he stated that they should emulate the name of one of the two MLB teams in New York. As "Yankees" was immediately out of the question, they chose "Giants" instead.

Tokyo Kyojin 
In 1936, with the formation of the Japanese Baseball League, the team changed its name to the Tokyo Kyojin, often called the Tokyo Giants in non-Japanese sources. It won eight league championships under that name from 1936 to 1943, including six championships in a row.

Pitcher Victor Starffin, nicknamed "the blue-eyed Japanese", starred for the team until 1944. One of the league's premier pitchers, he won two MVP awards and a Best Nine award, and won at least 26 games in six different years, winning a league-record 42 games in 1939. He followed his record-setting performance with another 38 wins in 1940. Pitcher Eiji Sawamura co-starred with Starffin on the Kyojin. He pitched the first no-hitter in Japanese pro baseball, on September 25, 1936, as well as two others. In 1937, he went 33–10 with a 1.38 earned run average. From 1937 to 1943 Sawamura had a record of 63–22, 554 strikeouts, and a 1.74 ERA. Sawamura enlisted in the Japanese Imperial Army in 1943. He was killed in battle when his ship was torpedoed near the end of the Second World War.

Outfielder Haruyasu Nakajima was a featured hitter during the franchise's first decade-and-a-half, and as player-manager led the Kyojin to a championship in 1941. Tetsuharu Kawakami was a team fixture from 1938 to 1958, winning the batting title five times, two home run crowns, three RBI titles, and had six titles for the most hits in a season. He was the first player in Japanese pro baseball to achieve 2,000 hits and was named the league's MVP three times. Leadoff man Shosei Go starred for the team from 1937 to 1943, winning league MVP in 1943.

Pitcher Hideo Fujimoto (also known as Hideo Nakagami) pitched for the team for 12 seasons from 1942 to 1955. He holds the Japanese records for lowest career ERA (1.90) and seasonal ERA (0.73 in 1943), as well as best all-time winning percentage (.697). He threw two career no-hitters, including the first perfect game in professional baseball. In addition, he served as the Giants' player-manager in 1944 (there was no 1945 season) and part of 1946.

Yomiuri Giants 
In 1947 the team became the Yomiuri Giants, winning the final JBL championship in 1949 (again under player-manager Haruyasu Nakajima). From 1938 to 1987 the Giants played at Korakuen Stadium, moving to their current home the Tokyo Dome in 1988.

In 1950, the Giants were one of the founding members of Nippon Professional Baseball, joining the Central League.

Slugger Noboru Aota starred for the Giants from 1948 to 1952, winning the home run championship twice, and hitting a home run in the 1951 Japan Series, when the Giants defeated the Nankai Hawks 4 games to 2 for their first NPB championship. Hawaiian Wally Yonamine was the first American to play professional baseball in Japan after World War II when he joined the Giants in 1951. A multi-skilled outfielder, as a Giant Yonamine was a member of four Japan Series Championship teams, the Central League Most Valuable Player in 1957, a consecutive seven-time Best Nine Award winner (1952–58), an eleven-time All-Star, and a three-time batting champion.

The team was the Central League champion every year from 1955 to 1959, winning the Japan Series championship in 1955, but they lost four consecutive Japan Series thereafter.

World career home run record holder Sadaharu Oh starred for the Giants from 1959 to 1980, and fellow Hall of Famer Shigeo Nagashima played for the team from 1958 to 1974. The Giants lineup, consisting of Oh batting third and Nagashima batting fourth, was nicknamed the ON Hou, ("Oh-Nagashima Cannon") as the two players emerged as the best hitters in the league. Now the team's manager, Tetsuharu Kawakami led the Giants to nine consecutive Japan Series championships from 1965 to 1973, and Oh and Nagashima dominated the batting titles during this period.  During his career, Oh was a five-time batting champion and fifteen-time home-run champion, and won the Central League most valuable player award nine times. Nagashima won the season MVP award five times, and the Best Nine Award every single year of his career (a total 17 times). Future Hall of Famer Tsuneo Horiuchi pitched for the team during its heyday, from 1966 to 1983. The renowned left-hander Masaichi Kaneda pitched for the team from 1965 to 1969, later having his number retired by the Giants.

Shigeo Nagashima was appointed manager of the Giants almost immediately after his retirement in 1974, staying in that position until 1980. After a couple of down years the Giants re-assumed their dominant position in the Central League, winning league championships in 1976 and 1977. Sadaharu Oh rejoined the team as manager from 1984 to 1988. Nagashima returned as Giants manager from 1993 to 2001, winning Japan Series championships in 1994, 1996, and 2000.

Outfielder Hideki Matsui starred for the Giants for ten seasons in the 1990s and early 2000s before migrating to Major League Baseball. He was a three-time NPB MVP, leading his team to four Japan Series, winning three titles (1994, 2000 and 2002), and earning the popular nickname "Godzilla". He also made nine consecutive All-Star Games and led the league in home runs and RBIs three times.

Managerial history

Players of note

Current roster

Former players 

#
 
 

 

 
 

 

 

 

 

 ,  
 
 

  
 

 (馬場 正平, ジャイアント馬場) (pitcher; later a pro wrestler, founder of All Japan Pro Wrestling)

Retired numbers

Season-by-season record 

Note: GP = Games played, W = Wins, L = Losses, T = Ties, % = Win Percentage

"Japan's team" and allegations of corruption 

Due to the Yomiuri company's vast influence in Japan as a major media conglomerate, the Giants have long been branded as "Japan's Team". In fact, for some years the Giants' uniforms had "Tokyo" on the jersey instead of "Yomiuri" or "Giants", seeming to imply that the Giants represent the vast metropolis and geopolitical center of Japan, even though the Yakult Swallows are also based in Tokyo and three other teams play in the Greater Tokyo Area. This bandwagon appeal has been compared with the marketability of the New York Yankees, Real Madrid, and Manchester United, except that support for the Giants nearly exceeds 50% of those polled, while in the United States and England, support is judged to be between 30% and 40% for the Yankees and Manchester United, respectively.  Correspondingly, fans of other professional baseball teams in Japan are often openly derisive and contemptuous of the Giants' bandwagon marketing tactics, and an "anti-Giants" movement exists in protest of the Giants' near-hegenomy.

In addition, despite the Giants having employed many foreign players over the years, many Japanese point proudly to the "pure-blooded period" of 1958–1974 when the team enjoyed continued success — 13 pennants — despite having no foreign players.

It has also long been alleged that the Giants rely on underhanded tactics to recruit the best players, involving bribes to players and amateur coaches, or using their influence on the governing council of Japanese professional baseball to pass rules that favors their recruiting efforts. This may be one explanation for the Giants' abundance of success in league play.  In August 2004, Yomiuri president Tsuneo Watanabe resigned after it was revealed that the club had violated scouting rules by paying ¥2 million to pitching prospect Yasuhiro Ichiba.  Ten months later, Watanabe was hired as chairman of the Yomiuri corporation.  In 2012, Asahi Shimbun discovered that the Giants had violated NPB rules by secretly paying pitcher Takahiko Nomaguchi while he was still an amateur playing in Japan's corporate league.

In 2009, the Giants played the Japan national baseball team in an unofficial goodwill game before the World Baseball Classic.

Controversies

1973 First nine consecutive victories in professional baseball history 
As of October 21 before this game was played, the game difference with the Hanshin Tigers was 0.5, this game resulting 9 to 0 victory over Tigers on October 22, infielder Shozo Doi and catcher Masaaki Mori are each 3 hits and Doi takes two point homerun in fifth innings from Kenji Furusawa. And Giants 4 to 1 win from Nankai Hawks (now Fukuoka SoftBank Hawks) in Japan Series, starter Kazumi Takahashi (23 win, 13 defeat) contribution this season.

Oh home run controversy 
In 1985, American Randy Bass, playing for the Hanshin Tigers, came into the last game of the season against the Oh-managed Giants with 54 home runs, one short of manager Sadaharu Oh's single-season record of 55.  Bass was intentionally walked four times on four straight pitches each time, leading Bass to famously hold his bat upside down.  Bass reached over the plate on the fifth occasion and batted the ball into the outfield for a single.  After the game, Oh denied ordering his pitchers to walk Bass, but Keith Comstock, an American pitcher for the Giants, later stated that an unnamed Giants coach had threatened a fine of $1,000 for every strike that any Giants pitcher threw to Bass. The magazine Takarajima investigated the incident and reported that the Giants front office had likely ordered the team not to allow Bass an opportunity to tie or break Oh's record.  For the most part the Japanese media remained silent on the incident as did league commissioner Takeso Shimoda. A similar situation to this was presented in the 1992 movie Mr. Baseball.

1994 Central League tie-breaker game 
For the first time in Japanese professional baseball history, the Giants and Chunichi Dragons ranked at the same percentage of the league warfare winning percentage, so both teams competed in a tie-breaker game to determine who gets to go to the Japan Series. The Giants won 6 to 3 against Chunichi, and took the Central League pennant and advanced to the Japan Series.

1996 Nagashima controversy 
The team accelerates at a stretch when winning in nine consecutive hits of professional baseball tie-record in one inning of July 9 against Hiroshima Carp's game.
Both main starter, Masaki Saito, Dominican Balvino Galvez raised 16 won games the most wins on this season, relief pitcher, Mario Brito who reinforced during the season and Hirofumi Kono supported the team, Hideki Matsui was very success as a main season. Rookies Toshihisa Nishi and Takayuki Shimizu were active and generation change was also decided admirably. At the time I reached the biggest 11.5 game difference in league history and accomplished the league championship. Although defeated lost 1 to 4 games by Orix BlueWave (now Orix Buffaloes) on Japan Series.

2008 Miracle season 
Despite losing five consecutive games from the opening game on March 28, On May 26, a banned drug was detected to be used by Luis Gonzalez, so he was suspended for 1 year from Nippon Professional Baseball for violating league anti-doping policies, and on the following day, the Giants decided to release Gonzalez from his contract. At the time, October reached the biggest 13 game (as July) difference in league history and accomplished the league championship, from September 19, including their 3rd consecutive victory against the Hanshin Tigers, they recorded a total of 12 consecutive victories for the first time in 32 years, followed by 3 to 1 winning the final direct confrontation on October 8. Contributors included Shinnosuke Abe, Yoshinobu Takahashi, Michihiro Ogasawara, Alex Ramirez, Seth Adam Greisinger, Marc Jason Kroon, Hisanori Takahashi, and Tetsuya Utsumi, The Giants, however, lost 3 games to 4 to the Saitama Seibu Lions in the 2008 Japan Series.

2011 Kiyotake controversy 
On 18 November 2011, Giants' general manager Hidetoshi Kiyotake was fired by the Yomiuri organization for "defamation of the team and Yomiuri newspaper group".  Kiyotake had recommended that Kaoru Okazaki be retained as the team's 2012 head coach.  After Yomiuri chairman Tsuneo Watanabe ordered Kiyotake to replace Okazaki with Suguru Egawa, Kiyotake called a public press conference on 11 November 2011 to complain about Watanabe's interference in the club's decision-making processes.  Yomiuri's response was to fire Kiyotake.

Okazaki was eventually selected to remain as the next season's coach.  The story made major headlines in the Japanese media.  On 13 December 2011, Kiyotake sued Yomiuri for ¥62 million for unfair dismissal and defamation and demanded that the company issue him a formal apology, printed in the Yomiuri Shimbun.  Yomiuri counter-sued Kiyotake for ¥100 million, saying that he had damaged the team's image.  The suits, combined into one case, opened in Tokyo District Court on 2 February 2012.

2012 Hara controversy 
In 2012 Japanese weekly Shukan Bunshun reported that current team manager Tatsunori Hara had paid ¥100 million to a former Yakuza gangster in response to a threat to go public on an extra-marital affair that Hara had been involved in.  The Yomiuri corporation admitted that the payout had been made, but sued Shukan Bunshun for insinuating that the incident had underworld connections.  The suit is pending.

2015 gambling controversy 
In 2015, an investigation by the league found that three Giants pitchers: Shoki Kasahara, Ryuya Matsumoto, and Satoshi Fukuda had bet on NPB and other sporting events with underworld bookmakers.  The Giants claimed that the three did not bet on Giants games.  Placing wagers on baseball games or associating with criminal elements is expressly prohibited in the contracts that all NPB players must sign, a rule similar to Major League Baseball's Rule 21 in North America, intended to prevent a repeat of the Black Sox Scandal of 1919 in Chicago, Illinois, USA. On 9 November 2015, the Giants organization terminated the contracts of all three players, with the league placing an indefinite disqualification on the players.

MLB players 

Active
 Taylor Jungmann (2015–2017)
 Justin Smoak (2021 - Present)
 Eric Thames (2021)
 Gerardo Parra (2020)
 Matt Andriese (2022 - Present)

Retired
 Takashi Kashiwada (1998)
 Takahito Nomura (2002)
 Joe Dillon (2007)
 Masumi Kuwata (2007)
 Ken Kadokura (2009)
 Hideki Matsui (2003–2012)
 Hideki Okajima (2007–2011, 2013)
 Hisanori Takahashi (2010–2013)
 Koji Uehara (2009–2017)

Mascots 
The Giants have 6 mascots, known as the Giabbits. They are based on one of the older logos of the Giants. They have 2 adult male mascots named Giabyi and Giabba (their jersey numbers are 333 and 555 respectively), an adult female mascot named Vicky, and 2 children mascots (a boy and a girl respectively), Tsuppy and Chappy (the former wears shorts and the latter wears a skirt and a headband on their left ear). The most recent one, Grandpa Giabbit, was introduced in 2014, the team's 80th anniversary. His jersey number is 1934, the year the team was founded.

Minor League Team 
The Giants farm team plays in the Eastern League. It was founded in 1949.

References

Further reading

External links 

 
 

 
Baseball teams established in 1934
Nippon Professional Baseball teams
Sports teams in Tokyo
1934 establishments in Japan